Ivan Miladinović (born 14 August 1994) is a Serbian football defender who plays for Russian club PFC Sochi.

Club career

Jagodina
Born in Ćuprija, Miladinović came throw the Jagodina youth academy. After he overgrown youth team, Miladinović was loaned to the satellite club Tabane for two spells in 2013 and 2014, making 14 appearances with 3 goals in each. In the meantime, he also made his senior debut for Jagodina in the Serbian Cup match against OFK Beograd, played on 9 April 2014.

At the beginning of 2015, Miladinović joined second tier club Sloga Kraljevo as a loaned player until the end of 2014–15 Serbian First League season. Playing for Sloga, Miladinović collected 13 matches, missing two games due to yellow card accumulation, and the red card he earned in a match against Sloboda Užice.

Next the club management made decision to rejuvenate the team, Miladinović returned to Jagodina's first team. He made his professional debut for the club in the first fixture match of the 2015–16 Serbian SuperLiga season, against Mladost Lučani. After Vukašin Tomić left the club at the beginning of 2017, Miladinović ended the 2014–15 Serbian First League season as a team captain.

Radnički Niš
At the beginning of 2017–18 season, Miladinović moved to Serbian SuperLiga side Radnički Niš, penning a three-year professional contract. He made his debut with new club in 1–1 draw to OFK Bačka on 9 September 2017. Several days later, Miladinović scored his first goal for Radnički in 1–0 victory over Borac Čačak, being also nominated for a man of the match.

Sochi
On 27 July 2021, he joined Russian Premier League club FC Nizhny Novgorod on loan from PFC Sochi.

Career statistics

References

External links
 Ivan Miladinović stats at utakmica.rs 
 
 
 

1994 births
People from Ćuprija
Living people
Serbian footballers
Association football defenders
FK Sloga Kraljevo players
FK Jagodina players
FK Radnički Niš players
PFC Sochi players
FC Nizhny Novgorod (2015) players
Serbian First League players
Serbian SuperLiga players
Serbian League players
Russian First League players
Russian Premier League players
Serbian expatriate footballers
Expatriate footballers in Russia
Serbian expatriate sportspeople in Russia